Kindness is a type of behavior marked by acts of generosity, consideration, rendering assistance or concern for others, without expecting praise or reward in return.

Kindness is a topic of interest in philosophy, religion, and psychology. Kindness was one of the main topics in the Bible. In Book II of Rhetoric, Aristotle defines kindness as "helpfulness towards someone in need, not in return for anything, nor for the advantage of the helper himself, but for that of the person helped". Nietzsche considered kindness and love to be the "most curative herbs and agents in human intercourse". Kindness is considered to be one of the Knightly Virtues. In Meher Baba's teachings, God is synonymous with kindness: "God is so kind that it is impossible to imagine His unbounded kindness!"

History
In English, the word kindness is from approximately 1300, though the word's sense evolved to its current meanings in the late 1300s.

Over time, it has acted in part of a personality trait as a long tradition of generosity through human cultures and family-friendly benefits in the concept of hospitality.

In society
In human mating choice, studies suggest that both men and women value kindness in their prospective mates, along with intelligence, physical appearance, attractiveness and age.

In psychology
Based on experiments at Yale University using games with babies, some studies concluded that kindness is inherent to human beings. There are similar studies about the root of empathy in infancy – motor mirroring developing in the early months of life, to lead (optimally) to the concern shown by children for their peers in distress.

Barbara Taylor and Adam Phillips have stressed the element of necessary realism in adult kindness, as well as the way "real kindness changes people in the doing of it, often in unpredictable ways".

In literature
 The Tirukkural, an ancient Indian work on ethics and morality, dedicates a chapter to kindness (chapter 8, verses 71–80), furthering the value in other chapters, such as hospitality (verses 81–90), uttering pleasant words (verses 91–100), compassion (verses 241–250), moral vegetarianism (verses 251–260), non-violence (verses 311–320), non-killing (verses 321–330), and benignity (verses 571–580), among others.
 Mark Twain from a compassion point of view considered "Kindness [as a] language which the deaf can hear and the blind can see."
 It has been suggested that "most of Shakespeare's opus could be considered a study of human kindness".
 Robert Louis Stevenson considered that 'the essence of love is kindness; and indeed it may best be defined as passionate kindness: kindness, so to speak, run mad and become importunate and violent'.
 The Christian apostle Paul lists kindness as one of the nine traits considered to be the "fruit of the Spirit"  in Galatians 5:22. In 1 Corinthians 13:4 he states, "Love is patient, love is kind."

In media
The motion picture Pay it Forward, based on the novel of the same name written in 1999 by the founder Catherine Ryan Hyde, which starred Kevin Spacey, Helen Hunt, Haley Joel Osment and Jon Bon Jovi, illustrates the power one person can have to make an impact on a chain reaction of kind deeds. The philosophy of Pay It Forward is that through acts of kindness among strangers, we all foster a more caring society. In the book and film, Reuben St. Clair, a social studies teacher in Atascadero, California, challenges his students to "change the world". One of his students, Trevor, takes the challenge to heart. He starts by showing kindness to a stranger which ripples further than he could have ever imagined.

In October 2011, Life Vest Inside posted a video called "Kindness Boomerang". It shows how one act of kindness passes seamlessly from one person to the next and boomerangs back to the person who set it into motion. Orly Wahba, Life Vest Inside Founder and Director of Kindness Boomerang explains that each scene was based on real-life experiences she personally went through; moments of kindness that left a lasting impression on her life. Within several months after its release, Kindness Boomerang went viral; reaching over 20 million people globally and eventually invadingWahba spot on TED2013 stage to speak about the power of kindness.

Singer-songwriter Harry Styles has been promoting kindness since at least 2017 with his slogan 'Treat People with Kindness', also abbreviated to 'TPWK'.

Teaching Kindness
Kindness is most often taught from parents to children and is learned through observation and some direct teaching. Studies have shown that through programs and interventions kindness can be taught and encouraged during the first 20 years of life.  Further studies show that kindness interventions can help improve wellbeing with comparable results as teaching gratitude. Similar findings have shown that organizational level teaching of kindness can improve wellbeing of adults in college. Numerous religions teach their members to be kind and religiosity is associated with greater wellbeing and longevity.

See also

References

Further reading
 
 
 Forget Survival of the Fittest: It Is Kindness That Counts (January 2017), Scientific American. "A psychologist probes how altruism, Darwinism, and neurobiology mean that we can succeed by not being cutthroat."

External links 

 
 A UK independent, not-for-profit organisation
 Random Acts of Kindness Foundation
 Video with quotes about Kindness, from Wikiquote

 
Giving
Virtue
Concepts in ethics
Seven virtues
Fruit of the Holy Spirit
Emotions
Moral psychology